Henri-Émile Bazin (10 January 1829 – 7 February 1917) was a French engineer specializing in hydraulic engineering.

Selected publications
Henry Darcy, Henri Bazin, "Recherches hydrauliques entreprises par M. Henry Darcy continuées par M. Henri Bazin. Première partie. Recherches expérimentales sur l'écoulement de l'eau dans les canaux découverts," Paris, Imprimerie impériale, 1865.
Henry Darcy, Henri Bazin, "Recherches hydrauliques entreprises par M. Henry Darcy continuées par M. Henri Bazin. Deuxième partie. Recherches expérimentales relatives au remous et à la propagation des ondes," Paris, Imprimerie impériale, 1865.

École Polytechnique alumni
École des Ponts ParisTech alumni
Corps des ponts
1829 births
1917 deaths
Fluid dynamicists
Hydraulic engineers
19th-century French engineers
Members of the French Academy of Sciences
People from Nancy, France
Engineers from Dijon